
This is a list of sieges, land and naval battles of the War of the Sixth Coalition (3 March 1813 – 30 May 1814). It includes:
 the German campaign of 1813;
 the campaign in north-east France;
 the Campaign in south-west France (final stage of the Peninsular War);
 the Illyrian campaign, part of the wider Adriatic campaign of 1807–1814;
 the Italian campaign (6 September 1813 – 18 April 1814); and
 the Low Countries campaign (12 November 1813 – 12 May 1814).

See also 
 List of battles of the War of the First Coalition
 List of battles of the War of the Second Coalition
 List of battles of the War of the Third Coalition
 List of battles of the War of the Fourth Coalition
 List of battles of the War of the Fifth Coalition
 List of battles of the Hundred Days (War of the Seventh Coalition)
 List of battles of the French invasion of Russia

Notes

References

Sources 

 
  (dbnl.org e-book)
 

Sixth Coalition